James Dawes may refer to:
 James Dawes (British politician) (1866–1921), British solicitor and politician 
 James W. Dawes (1845–1918), state senator and sixth governor of Nebraska